South Park: Bigger, Longer & Uncut is a 1999 American adult animated musical comedy film based on the animated sitcom South Park. The film was directed by series creator Trey Parker from a screenplay co-written with series co-creator Matt Stone and Pam Brady; and stars Parker, Stone, Mary Kay Bergman, and Isaac Hayes, all of whom reprise their roles from the series, with George Clooney, Eric Idle, and Mike Judge in supporting roles. The plot follows Stan, Kyle, Cartman, and Kenny as they sneak into an R-rated film starring the Canadian comedy duo Terrance and Phillip, after which they begin swearing. When the consequent moral panic culminates in the United States declaring war on Canada, Stan, Kyle and Cartman take it upon themselves to save Terrance and Phillip from execution, while Kenny tries to prevent a prophecy involving Satan and Saddam Hussein's intent to conquer the world.

Primarily centered on themes of censorship and scapegoating, the film also parodies and satirizes the animated films of the Disney Renaissance, musicals such as Les Misérables, and controversies surrounding the series itself. The film also heavily satirizes the Motion Picture Association of America; during production, Parker and Stone disputed with the MPAA, which returned the film multiple times with an NC-17 rating due to its use of profanity. The film's songs were written by Parker and Marc Shaiman, the latter of whom composed the score.

South Park: Bigger, Longer & Uncut premiered at Grauman's Chinese Theater on June 23, 1999, and was released theatrically in North America the following week by Paramount Pictures, with Warner Bros. Pictures handling international distribution. The film received generally positive reviews from critics, who praised its story, soundtrack, humor and themes. Produced on a $21 million budget, it grossed $83.1 million worldwide, making it the highest-grossing R-rated animated film until 2016. At the 72nd Academy Awards, the song "Blame Canada" was nominated for Best Original Song, but lost to Phil Collins' "You'll Be in My Heart" from Tarzan.

Plot 
One morning in South Park, Colorado, Stan Marsh, Kyle Broflovski and his adopted brother Ike, Eric Cartman, and Kenny McCormick visit the movie theater to see Terrance and Phillip's R-rated film, Asses of Fire. After initially being denied tickets, the boys pay a homeless man to accompany them. After watching the film, the boys begin swearing constantly. Their friends are impressed and also see the film, except for Wendy Testaburger, who becomes acquainted with transfer student Gregory, to Stan's jealousy.

When the children's parents find out, they are forbidden from seeing the film again, but do so multiple times. As a bet with Cartman, Kenny sets his fart on fire, imitating a scene from the film; he accidentally immolates himself and is rushed to the hospital, where he dies from a botched heart transplant. Barred from Heaven, Kenny descends into Hell, wherein he encounters Satan and his abusive partner Saddam Hussein. Meanwhile, Kyle's mother, Sheila, forms the Mothers Against Canada (M.A.C.) movement with other parents. Terrance and Phillip are arrested as war criminals; when the United States refuses to release them, Canada bombs the Baldwins in retaliation. The US declares war on Canada and arranges to have Terrance and Phillip executed during a USO show. After insulting Sheila, Cartman is implanted with a V-chip, which administers an electric shock whenever he swears.

Satan prophesies that the war is a sign of the apocalypse and upon Terrance and Phillip's deaths, he will invade and conquer Earth. After failing to persuade Satan to abandon Saddam, Kenny's ghost visits Cartman to warn him. Unable to reason with their mothers, Stan, Kyle, and Cartman form a resistance movement with their classmates to rescue Terrance and Phillip. At Gregory's behest, they recruit the French-accented, misotheistic Cristophe, nicknamed "the Mole." Kyle later hides Ike in their family's attic as Canadians are sent to internment camps. After the boys infiltrate the show, Stan and Kyle attempt to stall the execution, while Cartman attempts to deactivate the alarm as the Mole prepares to secure Terrance and Phillip. However, Kenny's ghost reappears before Cartman, who runs away in fear, forgetting to shut down the alarm. The Mole is discovered and fatally mauled by guard dogs.

The remaining boys try to warn their mothers about Satan's prophecy, but are ignored as the execution commences. The execution is interrupted when the Canadian Army launches a surprise attack, resulting in a massive battle between the two armies. Cartman deactivates the electrical switch, allowing Terrance and Phillip to escape; the shock from the switch causes his V-chip to malfunction. Stan chases after them, but is knocked out in an explosion. Members of M.A.C., horrified at what they incited, decide to abandon their cause, with only Sheila remaining committed.

Stan reawakens before a sentient clitoris, who tells him to be self-confident to gain Wendy's affection. Stan leads the others to Terrance and Phillip, whom the US Army have cornered. The children form a human shield as Kyle tries to reason with Sheila, faulting her for scapegoating others for his mistakes. While the soldiers begin to back down, Sheila refuses and shoots Terrance and Phillip dead, fulfilling Satan's prophecy. Saddam usurps Satan and demands that everyone bow to him. When Saddam insults Cartman, the latter's retort releases bolts of energy from his hands. Subsequently, Cartman engages in profanity-laden tirades to attack Saddam, who continues to verbally abuse Satan. Satan becomes enraged and throws Saddam back into Hell, where he is impaled on a stalagmite.

Grateful for Kenny's support, Satan grants him one wish. Kenny wishes for everything to return to a pre-war state, and parts with his friends before disappearing. South Park is restored as the casualties, including Terrance and Phillip, are undone. As Americans and Canadians make peace, Sheila reconciles with Kyle, as does Wendy with Stan. For his sacrifice, Kenny is allowed entry into Heaven.

Cast 

 Trey Parker as Stan Marsh / Eric Cartman / Gregory / Satan / Mr. Garrison / Mr. Hat / Phillip Niles Argyle / Randy Marsh / Clyde Donovan / Tom – News Reporter / Midget in a Bikini / Bill Clinton / Canadian Ambassador / Bombardiers / Mr. Mackey / Army General / Ned Gerblansky / Bill Allen / Fosse McDonald /  Christophe – Ze Mole (or The Mole) / Big Gay Al (singing voice) / Adolf Hitler / additional voices
 Matt Stone as Kyle Broflovski / Kenny McCormick (Hooded) / Saddam Hussein (credited to "Himself") / Terrance Henry Stoot / Big Gay Al / Ticket Taker / Stuart McCormick / Jimbo Kearn / Gerald Broflovski / Butters Stotch / American Ambassador / additional voices
 Mary Kay Bergman as Liane Cartman / Sheila Broflovski / Sharon Marsh / Carol McCormick / Wendy Testaburger / Clitoris / additional voices
 Isaac Hayes as Chef Jerome McElroy
 Jesse Howell, Anthony Cross-Thomas and Franchesca Clifford as Ike Broflovski (Franchesca Clifford was credited as "Francesca Clifford")
 Bruce Howell as Man in Theatre
 Deb Adair as Woman in Theatre
 Jennifer Howell as Bebe Stevens
 George Clooney as Dr. Gouache ("Dr. Doctor" on screen)
 Brent Spiner as Conan O'Brien
 Minnie Driver as Brooke Shields
 Dave Foley as the Baldwin brothers
 Eric Idle as Dr. Vosknocker
 Nick Rhodes as Canadian Fighter Pilot
 Toddy E. Walters as Winona Ryder
 Stewart Copeland as American Soldier #1
 Stanley G. Sawicki as American Soldier #2
 Mike Judge as Kenny's Goodbye
 Howard McGillin as Gregory (singing voice) (uncredited)

Production

Development 

Development for the film began during production of South Parks first season in January 1998. Co-creators Trey Parker and Matt Stone signed a deal with Comedy Central that April which contracted the duo to produce episodes until 1999, as well as an unspecified amount to produce a film based on the series. Part of Parker and Stone's conditions were that the film must at least receive an R rating, keeping it in line with the series' humor and its predecessor short films both titled The Spirit of Christmas. Parker stated that their desire was to approach the film from a more creative perspective and do more than a simple feature length episode. Despite alleged pressure from Paramount Pictures executives to tone down the film, Parker and Stone's conditions were eventually met.

"They really wanted to be able to go beyond the South Park television show," Comedy Central spokesman Tony Fox reported to TV Guide. "They really fought hard for and won the right to make an R-rated movie." Paramount executives went as far to prepare graphs displaying how much more revenue a PG-13-rated South Park film would potentially generate. The William Morris Agency, which represented Parker and Stone, pushed for the film's production to begin as soon as possible, while public interest was still high, instead of several years into its run, as was the case with Beavis and Butt-Head Do America (1996).

Casting 
As in the television series, most of the characters are voiced by Parker, Stone, and Mary Kay Bergman. Isaac Hayes reprised his role as Chef, and audio samples of staff children Jesse Howell, Anthony Cross-Thomas and Franchesca Clifford were used for the voice of Ike Broflovski. Guest voices for the film include George Clooney as Dr. Gouache, Brent Spiner as Conan O'Brien, Minnie Driver as Brooke Shields, Eric Idle as Dr. Vosnocker, and Dave Foley as brothers Alec, Billy, Daniel and Stephen Baldwin.

Michael McDonald, who performs the closing track "Eyes of a Child", performs Satan's high notes in "Up There", and Howard McGillin provides Gregory's singing voice in "La Résistance (Medley)". Former The Police drummer Stewart Copeland voices a United States Army soldier. Mike Judge, creator of Beavis and Butt-Head and King of the Hill, provides Kenny's voice in his sole speaking appearance at the end of the film. Although initially denied by Paramount, Metallica vocalist James Hetfield performs the track "Hell Isn't Good", which was confirmed by Parker in the 2009 Blu-ray commentary.

Writing 
The first season episode "Death" heavily influenced the film's screenplay; both plots center on the parents of South Park protesting Terrance and Phillip due to the perceived negative influence it has over their children. Parker stated, "After about the first year of South Park, Paramount already wanted to make a South Park movie, and we sort of thought this episode would make the best model just because we liked the sort of pointing at ourselves kind of thing." During this time, the team was also busy with the second and third seasons of the series, the former of which Parker and Stone later described as "disastrous". As such, perceiving that the initial fervor would wane, they decided to write the film as a personal, fully committed musical.

Animation 
The film was animated using Alias|Wavefront PowerAnimator, running on SGI O2 and Octane workstations. Characters and individual scene elements were designed with texture mapping and shading that, when rendered, resemble the cutout animation of the short films and the series' first episode. The animation crew used a multiprocessor SGI Origin 2000 and 31 multiprocessor Origin 200 servers for both rendering and asset management. Backgrounds, characters and other items could be saved separately or as fully composited scenes, with convenient access at later points. "By creating flat characters and backgrounds in a 3D environment, we are able to add textures and lighting effects that give the film a cut-out construction paper stop-motion style which would have taken many more months if done traditionally," stated line producer Gina Shay. By the fifth season, the series transitioned to Maya. The studio now runs a 120-processor render farm that can produce 30 or more shots per hour. The animation of South Park: Bigger, Longer, & Uncut is therefore seen as an example of how South Parks visual quality has improved in recent seasons. In the audio commentary on the 2009 Blu-ray release, Stone and Parker criticize how "bad and time consuming" the animation was during that time. IGN described the animation as "fall[ing] somewhere within the middle ground—not quite cardboard cutouts, but not quite fully computerized either." Nate Boss, in a review for High-Def Digest, commented, "There is no comparing the two, as the movie has a classic (for South Park, at least) animated feel, so full of the cut-outs we have grown to love, while the newer seasons sport a more computer processed feel." The film, compared to the series at the time of its production, was animated in widescreen (1.66:1). "Although the 'primitive' animation of South Park is supposedly a joke, it's really a secret weapon," wrote Stephanie Zacharek of Salon. "The simplicity of Parker and Stone's technique is what makes it so effective."

Post-production 
The crew alternated between the film and the series, pushing both to scheduling extremes; changes to the film were made as late as two weeks before its release as the crew continually disputed with Paramount: "They wanted a Disney kind of trailer. We said no. They put together a totally un-South Park MTV video for the song 'What Would Brian Boitano Do?'. We had to go make our own version." Paramount's first trailer for the film advertised it, according to Parker, as "the laughiest movie of the summer", and promoted it in a way that South Park "was completely against". Parker and Stone told the studio of their dissatisfaction with the trailer, and upon the creation of a second trailer with minimal changes, the two broke the videocassette in half before returning it to the studio. "It was war," said Stone in 2000. "They were saying, 'Are you telling us how to do our job?' And I was going, 'Yes, because you're fucking stupid and you don't know what you're doing.'" In another instance, Paramount used the film's songs to create a music video for MTV. In accordance with broadcast standards, various parts were edited out; Parker described the final result as a "horrible little medley with all humor absent". The studio sent the original tape to Parker and Stone over the weekend with plans to send it to MTV on Monday to prepare it for a Wednesday airdate. Instead, Stone took the tape home, and Paramount threatened to sue Parker and Stone in response. Parker also noted that the title is an innuendo, and that "they (the MPAA) just didn't get it"; the initially considered name for the film was South Park: All Hell Breaks Loose, but had to be changed when, unlike the official name, the MPAA objected to the use of the word "Hell". Parker admitted incredulity later that the MPAA failed to realize the official name, in his opinion, was considered an even worse title, as besides acting as a description of the film compared to the series, the name could also refer to an uncircumcised penis.

Music 

The film's songs were written by Parker and Marc Shaiman; Shaiman also composed the film's score. The fourteen songs in the film recall various Broadway musicals. The soundtrack also parodies many familiar Disney conventions, with several songs spoofing such films as Beauty and the Beast and The Little Mermaid. "Mountain Town" has been compared to Oklahoma! and Beauty and the Beasts "Belle", while "La Résistance (Medley)" was favorably compared to Les Misérables. "I'm Super" recalls "Be Our Guest" and South Pacifics "Honey Bun", and "Kyle's Mom's a Bitch" echoes Chitty Chitty Bang Bang; "Up There", "I Can Change" and the "Mountain Town (Reprise)"  recall The Little Mermaids "Part of Your World", "Poor Unfortunate Souls" and "Part of Your World (Finale)"; and "Uncle Fucka" also drew comparisons to Oklahoma!, particularly in its coda. "Hell Isn't Good", which accompanies Kenny's descent to Hell, was sung by an uncredited James Hetfield.

The soundtrack received critical acclaim, with Entertainment Weekly describing it as "a cast album that gleefully sends up all the Hollywood musical conventions we're being deprived of." The soundtrack was released June 15, 1999, by Atlantic Records. "Blame Canada" was frequently highlighted as one of the best songs in the album and was nominated for the Academy Award for Best Original Song. "I was like, 'We're going to get nominated for an Academy Award for this.' I really was," Parker said. "I even told him [Shaiman]." Shaiman spoke of the song, "We're making fun of people who pick ridiculous targets to blame anything about what's going on in their lives, so Canada was just the perfect, ridiculous, innocuous choice for a target." In 2011, Time called the soundtrack the "finest, sassiest full-movie musical score since the disbanding of the Freed unit at MGM."

Release 

Paramount and Warner Bros. Pictures (whose respective parent companies Viacom and Time Warner formerly jointly owned Comedy Central) collaborated in distributing the film; Paramount released the film in the United States, while Warner Bros. distributed the film internationally.

The film was rated R for "pervasive vulgar language and crude sexual humor, and for some violent images" by the Motion Picture Association of America. The board's objections to the film were described in highly specific terms in private memos by Paramount executives. The MPAA initially insisted on the more prohibitive NC-17 rating. Of the six times the film was screened to the MPAA, it was designated NC-17 after five screenings, the last of which was two weeks before its scheduled release. A marketing agent from Paramount called Parker and Stone and explained that the studio "needed" an R. In response, Stone contacted producer Scott Rudin, who in turn called a Paramount executive and, in Stone's words, "freaked out on them". The film's rating was lowered to R the following day, with the original film intact. "The ratings board only cared about the dirty words; they're so confused and arbitrary," said Parker to The New York Times. "They didn't blink twice because of violence." During production of the film's trailer, the MPAA objected to certain words but found no issue with a scene in which soldiers are shot dead. "They had a problem with words, not bullets," he said. The MPAA gave Paramount specific notes for the film; in contrast, Parker and Stone's NC-17-rated Orgazmo, released in 1998 by Rogue Pictures, was not given any specifications on how to be acceptable for an R rating. One of these notes stated that if the script exceeded 400 swear words, the movie would be given an NC-17 rating. Parker and Stone responded to this by using 399. The duo attributed the R rating to the fact that Paramount and Warner Bros. are both members of the MPAA; the former denied these claims. In the United Kingdom, the film was given a 15 certificate by the British Board of Film Classification for "frequent coarse language and crude sexual references" with no edits made. In Australia, it was rated MA15+ (Mature accompanied for those under 15) by the Australian Classification Board. In Canada, the film received 18A and 14A certificates in most provinces, and a 13+ certificate in Quebec.

As predicted through the characters' actions in the film, there were numerous news reports of underage patrons unsuccessfully attempting to sneak into the film. There were also reports of adolescents seeing the film under the pretense of purchasing tickets to Wild Wild West, which was released on the same date. This was a result of an industry-wide crackdown on such attempts, as proposed by President Bill Clinton in response to the moral panic generated by the Columbine High School massacre two months before the film's release. The film was cited, along with American Pie, as an explicit film released in the summer of 1999 tempting underage youth to sneak into theaters. There were similar reports of the film attracting an underage crowd when the film was released in the United Kingdom in August 1999.

In the aftermath of Columbine in relation to the film's release, Parker was questioned whether he felt "youth culture [was] under fire", to which he commented: "[I]t's amazingly strange, because that climate is what the movie is all about, and we wrote it more than a year ago. So when [Columbine] happened, we were like, 'Wow.' What we wrote about in this movie came true in terms of people's attitudes. The movie is also about war, and then that happened, too." Hayes responded to conservatives urging prudishness as a cure for society's ills: "If we give in to that and allow [entertainment] to become a scapegoat, you might wind up living in who-knows-what kind of state... If you believe in [your artistic vision] and you've got a moral conviction, take it to 'em!" The rating of the film later brought comparisons to Stanley Kubrick's Eyes Wide Shut, which was released in theaters in a digitally altered and censored version two weeks after South Park; the original cut was rated NC-17 before Warner Bros. altered it to ensure an R rating. In response to these debates and controversy, Stone called the MPAA a "bumbling, irresponsible organization".

Promotion 
Paramount's licensing arm significantly expanded retail distribution beyond specialty stores (Hot Topic, Spencer's) to major retailers (Target, J.C. Penney), which involved carefully stripping T-shirts of objectionable material. Licensing industry observers credited Comedy Central with carving out a profitable niche in an industry dominated by partnerships linking fast-food restaurants and major film studios, which was particularly difficult for South Park, as fast-food chains did not want to associate with the series' content. Eventually, J.C. Penney ended its South Park tie-ins in April 1999 as a result of customer complaints. In July 1999, Parker and Stone appeared on Late Night with Conan O'Brien to promote the film's release. During the interview, Parker and Stone showed a clip of the film in which O'Brien (Brent Spiner) hands over Terrance and Phillip to the US government before committing suicide. Upon seeing the clip, O'Brien responded that his interns thought that it was "really funny", but were annoyed that the Late Night set was portrayed as on the top floor of the GE Building, when it was really on the sixth floor. The film also suffered negative publicity before release. It was initially reported that on the day of the Columbine massacre, a friend of the perpetrators, Chris Morris, was seen wearing a black T-shirt depicting characters from South Park. Both Parker and Stone are from Colorado, and Stone attended the nearby Heritage High School. Following the massacre, Stone took a three-day sabbatical: "Nothing seemed funny after that," he said. South Park was also, at the time, generally waning in popularity: ratings dropped nearly 40 percent with the premiere of the third season and, according to Entertainment Weekly, "it [wasn't] the pop-culture behemoth it was last year [1998]." In response to the decline, Parker commented, "Suddenly we suck and we're not cool anymore. The funny thing is, last year we were saying the same things and we were hip, fresh, and cute. Now they're telling us we're pushing 30, we're failures, and we're sellouts."

Home media 
The film was released on DVD in the US on November 23, 1999, with a VHS release initially exclusively as a rental. A traditional retail VHS release was issued on May 16, 2000. The DVD contained three theatrical trailers for special features, which many criticized as being typical of "bare-bones" DVD releases. A laserdisc release was issued on January 18, 2000; this release is markedly rare, as it was issued late in the format's lifespan. The film was re-released on Blu-ray on June 30, 2009, ten years after its theatrical release. In addition to the trailers, this release featured an audio commentary from Parker and Stone and a special "What Would Brian Boitano Do?" music video. This release was sourced from the original film negative, which resulted in audio sync issues. IGN's Scott Lowe explained, "Although clearly aged, South Park: Bigger, Longer, and Uncut looks great and is free of the washed out, compressed imperfections of previous standard definition releases of the film." However, Michael Zupan of DVDTalk notes that an automatic digital scratch removal process may have inadvertently removed some intentional lines from the picture, notably during Cartman's first scene with the V-chip. In the commentary, Parker and Stone, as well as other crew members, reveal that they had no recollection of making the film due to heavy scheduling.

Reception

Critical response 
The website's consensus states: "Its jokes are profoundly bold and rude but incredibly funny at the same time." On Metacritic it has a score of 73 out of 100 based on reviews from 31 critics, indicating "generally favorable reviews". Audiences surveyed by CinemaScore gave the film a grade "B−" on scale of A to F.

Rita Kempley of The Washington Post described it as "outrageously profane" and "wildly funny", writing that "While censorship is the filmmakers' main target […] [Parker and Stone's] favorite monster is the Motion Picture Association of America, self-appointed guardians of the nation's chastity. It's all in good dirty fun and in service of their pro-tolerance theme." Stephen Holden of The New York Times regarded the film's "self-justifying moral" as "about mass entertainment, censorship and freedom of speech." He also praised Cartman's subjection to the V-chip as "the movie's sharpest satirical twist, reminiscent of A Clockwork Orange". Entertainment Weekly graded the film an A− and commended the film's message in a post-Columbine society, as well as the musical numbers, which "brilliantly parody / honor the conventions of Broadway show tunes and, especially, the Disney-formula ditties that began with Alan Menken and Howard Ashman." Writing for The Washington Post, Michael O'Sullivan neutrally regarded the film's offensive nature, commenting "Yes, the lampooning is more broad than incisive, but under the bludgeoning of this blunt instrument very few sacred cows are left standing." Reviewing the film for Time, Richard Corliss wrote that "you may laugh yourself sick – as sick as this ruthlessly funny movie is." Corliss later named the film his fifth favorite animated film of all time.

The film also had detractors, without noting the conservative family groups offended by the film's humor. Jack Matthews of the Daily News suggested the film's running time made Parker and Stone "run out of ideas". Roger Ebert stated that the "vicious social satire" of the film both "offended" and "amazed" him. Ebert rated the film  of 4 stars, calling it "the year's most slashing political commentary", but also wrote that "it is too long and runs out of steam, but it serves as a signpost for our troubled times. Just for the information it contains about the way we live now, thoughtful and concerned people should see it. After all, everyone else will."

Box office 
On a $21 million budget, South Park: Bigger, Longer & Uncut opened at number three behind Star Wars: Episode I – The Phantom Menace and Tarzan, with a gross of $14,783,983 over the four-day Independence Day weekend from 2,128 theaters for an average of $6,947 per theater ($11,090,000 and an average of $5,211 over three days) and a total of $19,637,409 since its Wednesday launch. It went on to gross $52,037,603 in the United States and Canada, with the 3-day opening making up 22% of the final domestic gross. It made an additional $31.1 million internationally for a total of $83,137,603 worldwide.

It was the highest-grossing R-rated animated film since Akira (1988), until it was surpassed by Sausage Party (2016), which grossed more than $140 million worldwide; that record was, in turn, surpassed by Demon Slayer: Kimetsu no Yaiba the Movie: Mugen Train in 2020, which grossed more than $500 million worldwide.

Accolades 
South Park: Bigger, Longer & Uncut was nominated for an Academy Award for Best Original Song for "Blame Canada". As a joke, Parker and Stone attended the 72nd Academy Awards ceremony in drag. It was later revealed on 6 Days to Air that they were high on LSD during the pre-show and the ceremony.  When "Blame Canada" was scheduled to be performed, ABC requested that lyrics be written to comply with their S&P department. "It would be ironic to have to change the words in a movie about censorship," remarked Shaiman. The department was particularly critical of the song's use of the word fuck and allusions to the Ku Klux Klan. When Parker and Shaiman declined these requests, Robin Williams, a friend of Shaiman's, performed the song with black tape over his mouth and turned his back when profanities were sung. The award ultimately went to Phil Collins' "You'll Be in My Heart", as featured in Tarzan. In response, Parker and Stone ridiculed him in two consecutive episodes of the series' fourth season: "Cartman's Silly Hate Crime 2000" and "Timmy 2000". In the DVD commentary for the latter episode, Parker states that they were "fully expecting to lose, just not to Phil Collins".

The film is recognized by American Film Institute in these lists:
 2004: AFI's 100 Years...100 Songs:
 "Blame Canada" – Nominated
 2006: AFI's Greatest Movie Musicals – Nominated
 2008: AFI's 10 Top 10:
 Nominated Animation Film

Lists and records 
 The film has been nominated by the American Film Institute for their list of the Greatest American Musicals.
 In 2000, readers of Total Film magazine voted the film at No. 13 in the greatest comedy films of all time.
 In 2001, Terry Gilliam selected it as one of the ten best animated films of all time.
 In 2006, South Park finished fifth on the United Kingdom Channel 4's "50 Greatest Comedy Films" vote.
 Readers of Empire, in a 2006 poll, voted it No. 166 in the greatest films of all time.
 In 2008, the film was included in Entertainment Weeklys list of the "25 Movie Sequels We'd Line Up to See" and "The Funniest Movies of the Past 25 Years".
 The film is No. 5 on Bravo's 100 Funniest Movies.
 IGN named it the sixth greatest animated film of all time in their Top 25 list.
In 2011, Time named it the sixth greatest animated feature of all-time.
In 2021, it was listed as one of the best animated films of all time by Complex.

Legacy 
Following its release, MPAA president Jack Valenti stated that he regretted not giving the film an NC-17 rating. In response to the film's controversy, the MPAA expanded its system with detailed descriptions adjacent to its ratings beginning in 2000. The film's use of profanity earned it a 2001 Guinness World Record for "Most Swearing in an Animated Movie" (399 profanities, including 139 uses of fuck; 128 offensive gestures; and 221 acts of violence).

In the song "Uncle Fucka", fuck is said 31 times. Throughout 2000, Blink-182 often ended songs on their The Mark, Tom, and Travis Show Tour with lines from "Uncle Fucka". The lines can be heard on the band's live album, The Mark, Tom, and Travis Show (The Enema Strikes Back!).

While the actual Saddam Hussein was on trial for genocide charges in 2006, Stone joked that the U.S. military was repeatedly showing Hussein the film as a form of torture. Parker and Stone were given a signed photo of Hussein by American soldiers.

Subsequent film development 
In 2007, during development of the "Imaginationland" trilogy, Parker and Stone described the possibility of producing it as a film, but ultimately abandoned these plans amid a demanding production schedule. Parker and Stone said in a 2008 interview that a theatrically released sequel would most likely be what concludes the series.

In 2011, when the official South Park website FAQ was asked whether a sequel would be made, it was responded with "the first South Park movie was so potent, we're all still recovering from the blow. Unfortunately, at the current moment, there are no plans for a second South Park movie. But you never know what the future may bring, crazier things have happened..."

In 2013, Warner Bros. relinquished its rights to co-finance any further South Park films during their negotiations to co-finance Christopher Nolan's Interstellar. Previous efforts to produce another South Park film were complicated by both Paramount and Warner Bros. retaining certain rights to the IP.

In August 2021, a series of 14 television films was announced for Paramount+ as part of a multi-year deal with Parker and Stone, the first two of which premiered in November and December 2021.

See also 
 Canada–United States relations
 List of musical films
 List of adult animated films

References

External links 

 
 South Park: Bigger, Longer & Uncut at the TCM Movie Database
 
 
 
 

1999 films
1999 animated films
1999 comedy films
1990s American animated films
1990s black comedy films
1990s English-language films
1990s satirical films
1990s fantasy comedy films
1999 computer-animated films
Obscenity controversies in film
Adult animated comedy films
American adult animated films
American adventure films
American animated comedy films
American black comedy films
American computer-animated films
American fantasy films
American fantasy comedy films
American musical films
American musical comedy films
American political comedy films
American political satire films
American war films
American war comedy films
Animated films based on animated series
Animated musical films
Animated war films
Apocalyptic films
Canada–United States relations in South Park
Comedy Central animated films
Cultural depictions of Adolf Hitler
Cultural depictions of Alec Baldwin
Cultural depictions of Bill Clinton
Cultural depictions of Bill Gates
Cultural depictions of Mahatma Gandhi
Cultural depictions of Saddam Hussein
Disney parodies
Films about bullying
Films about Canada–United States relations
Films about censorship
Films about domestic violence
Films about discrimination
Films about mass murder
Films about murder
Films about prejudice
Films about racism
Films about sexual abuse
Films based on television series
Films directed by Trey Parker
Films produced by Matt Stone
Films produced by Trey Parker
Films scored by Marc Shaiman
Films set in Colorado
Films set in hell
Films with screenplays by Matt Stone
Films with screenplays by Pam Brady
Films with screenplays by Trey Parker
LGBT-related animated films
Film controversies
Rating controversies in film
Military humor in film
Musical parodies
Paramount Pictures animated films
Portrayals of Jesus in film
South Park (franchise) films
The Devil in film
Warner Bros. animated films
Works about profanity